The Jonathan Dexter Record House is a historic house at 39-41 Grandview Avenue in Quincy, Massachusetts.  This large two-family house was probably built in the 1890s, and is one of the largest and finest Queen Anne houses on Wollaston Hill.  It has classic elements of the style, including a three-story tower with conical roof, asymmetrical massing, and a wealth of varying gables and windows.  Jonathan D. Record, for whom it was built, was a Boston dry plates manufacturer.

The house was listed on the National Register of Historic Places in 1989.

See also
National Register of Historic Places listings in Quincy, Massachusetts

References

Houses in Quincy, Massachusetts
Queen Anne architecture in Massachusetts
Houses completed in 1890
National Register of Historic Places in Quincy, Massachusetts
Houses on the National Register of Historic Places in Norfolk County, Massachusetts